Parinari elmeri is a tree in the family Chrysobalanaceae. It is named for the American botanist Adolph Elmer.

Description
The mottled bark is pale cream or grey and white. The wood is used by the Iban people of Borneo in the construction of their longhouses. The flowers are white.

Distribution and habitat
Parinari elmeri grows naturally in Peninsular Malaysia, Borneo and the Philippines. Its habitat is mixed dipterocarp forests from sea-level to  altitude.

References

elmeri
Trees of Peninsular Malaysia
Trees of Borneo
Trees of the Philippines
Plants described in 1929